Give Me Your Heart Tonight is an album by Welsh rock and roll singer Shakin' Stevens, released in October 1982 by Epic Records. To date, it is his last studio album to reach the Top-Ten in the UK, peaking at number 3 on the Album Chart.

Release 
In total, five singles were released from the album. "Oh Julie" was the first released, reaching number 1 in the UK and was also Stevens' first self-penned hit. A cover of John Fred and the Playboys' "Shirley" was released next, also becoming a Top-Ten hit. The title track "Give Me Your Heart" peaked at number 11, ending Stevens' run of six consecutive UK Top-Ten singles. The next single, a cover of Jackie Wilson's "I'll Be Satisfied" scraped into the Top-Ten. The final single, "Vanessa" was only released In South Africa, with the B-side being "I'll Be Satisfied".

In the US and Canada, the album was released in March 1983 with only 10 tracks, omitting "Sapphire", "You Never Talk About Me" and "Que Sera, Sera". The album was first released on CD in 1990 in Australia, but was not officially released on CD elsewhere until 2009 as part of The Epic Masters box set, which includes bonus tracks.

Reception
Reviewing the album for Record Mirror, Simon Tebbutt gave it two out of five stars, writing that "apart from the obligatory "Julie" and "Shirley" singles", the album offers "nothing more than a tired old parade of clapped out classics". He describes Stevens' as "beyond a joke these days. Decanted, disinfected rock 'n' roll that runs to the plaintive on numbers like the title track "Give Me Your Heart Tonight" and the desperate attempts at raucousness on numbers like "Sapphire"."

For Smash Hits, Kimberley Leston gave the album six of out ten and wrote "even if you've only heard one of Shaky's singles, then you've heard this entire album." "Shaky's sugary sweetness leaves you momentarily satisfied but soon you feel a bit ill and in need of some sustenance."

Reviewed in Billboard, in Recommended LP's: "Now that the Stray Cats have made it, can the more cleaned up rockabilly of Shakin' Stevens be far behind". "The songs here are catchy, and there is certainly heart-throb appeal."

Retrospectively reviewing for AllMusic, Dave Thompson wrote that the album's "slickness and sheen were so pronounced that, even today, it simply feels too over-produced for its own good. Up until now, even Stevens' most egregious pop confections had retained a hint of the old rock & rolling energy for which he was once renowned. But 1982 saw him grab the mantel of Family Entertainer with such resolve that the past was all but irrelevant, and the songs that make up Give Me Your Heart Tonight are little more than watery pop. The thrill had gone -- or, as the album's closing number simpered, "que sera sera"."

Track listing

2009 bonus tracks:

Personnel
Shaky's musicians
 Shakin' Stevens – vocals
 Dick Bland – bass guitar
 Billy Bremner – lead guitar
 Roger McKew – rhythm guitar
 Gavin Povey – piano, accordion
 Chris Wyles – drums
 Ray Beavis – tenor saxophone
 John "Irish" Earle – baritone saxophone
 Chris Gower – trombone
 Dick Hanson – trumpet

Guest musicians
 B. J. Cole – steel guitar (11)
 Stuart Colman – bass guitar (1, 3, 4, 6, 9, 11)
 Mickey Gee – lead guitar (4, 6, 9, 11)
 Howard Tibble – drums (4, 6, 9, 11)
 Geraint Watkins – piano/accordion (4, 6, 9, 11)
 Pete Wingfield – piano (1, 3)

Technical
 Rod Houison – engineer
 Neill King – engineer
 Stuart Colman – producer
 Freya Miller – management
 Allan Ballard – photography

Charts

Certifications and sales

References

1982 albums
Epic Records albums
Shakin' Stevens albums